Kinetic Engineering Limited is an Indian automotive manufacturer. The company was founded in the year 1972 by H. K. Firodia. Today it is an automotive component manufacturer which formerly sold two-wheelers under the brand names Kinetic Honda and later Kinetic Motors. It introduced the Kinetic Luna moped which sold well domestically and was exported extensively to Argentina, Brazil, Sri Lanka, and the United States.

Later Kinetic Engineering formed a joint venture with Honda Motor Company to introduce Kinetic Honda scooters, which had electric start and gearless transmissions. Kinetic and Honda parted ways in 1998 when the Firodias bought the majority stake of the joint venture from Honda. In 2008, Kinetic entered into a joint venture with Mahindra Automobiles, where Mahindra held an 80% stake. By this joint venture, Mahindra acquired the two-wheeler manufacturing facilities as well as the then selling brands of Kinetic.

After ceasing two-wheeler manufacturing, Kinetic Engineering produces and exports automotive components. Kinetic Motors resumed operations in January 2011 and has announced plans to produce electric vehicles.

In February 2014, Kinetic sold its stake in Mahindra Two-Wheelers to Samena Capital for 182 crore rupees.

In 2015 MV Agusta entered a partnership with Kinetic Group for its Indian debut.

See also 
 H. K. Firodia Awards

Notes

External links

Motorcycle manufacturers of India
Scooter manufacturers
Companies based in Pune
Vehicle manufacturing companies established in 1972
1972 establishments in Maharashtra
Indian companies established in 1972